The 24th Annual Australian Recording Industry Association Music Awards (generally known as ARIA Music Awards or simply The ARIAs) are a series of award ceremonies which included the 2010 ARIA Artisan Awards, ARIA Hall of Fame Awards, ARIA Fine Arts Awards and ARIA Awards. The latter ceremony took place on 7 November at the Sydney Opera House and was telecast by Network Ten at 8:30pm. The final nominees for ARIA Award categories were announced on 28 September at the Sydney Conservatorium of Music, as well as nominees for Fine Arts Awards and winners of the Artisan Awards. The 2010 awards were hosted by Russell Brand, Rebel Wilson and Matt Lucas.

For the first time in ARIA Awards history, public votes are used in four new categories, "Most Popular Australian Album", "Most Popular Australian Single", "Most Popular International Artist" and "Most Popular Australian Artist".

On 27 October, the ARIA Hall of Fame inducted: The Church, The Loved Ones, Models, John Williamson and Johnny Young.

Multiple winners and nominees

Angus & Julia Stone – 5 wins from 9 nominations
Sia – 3 wins from 6 nominations
Washington – 2 wins from 6 nominations
Powderfinger – 2 wins from 5 nominations
The Temper Trap – 2 wins from 5 nominations
Dan Sultan – 2 wins from 3 nominations
Birds of Tokyo – 1 win from 7 nominations
Guy Sebastian – 5 nominations
Tame Impala – 5 nominations

ARIA Hall of Fame Inductees 

The following artists were inducted into the 2010 ARIA Hall of Fame on 27 October at Sydney's Hordern Pavilion; the ceremony was telecast by SBS TV's RocKwiz at 9:20 p.m on 30 October.

The Church by George Negus
The Loved Ones by Michael Chugg
Models by Wendy Matthews
John Williamson by Bob Brown
Johnny Young by Tina Arena

Awards

ARIA Awards
Three new categories introduced, "Breakthrough Artist" (formerly "Breakthrough Artist – Single" and "Breakthrough Artist – Album"), "Best Hard Rock / Heavy Metal Album" and "Best Adult Alternative Album". Final nominees are shown, with result at right.

{| class="wikitable"
|-
!colspan=5|
Album of the Year
|-
!colspan=2|Artist
!colspan=2|Album
!Result
|-
|colspan=2|Angus & Julia Stone
|colspan=2| Down the Way
|
|-
|colspan=2|Birds of Tokyo
|colspan=2| Birds of Tokyo
|
|-
|colspan=2|Sia
|colspan=2| We Are Born
|
|-
|colspan=2|Tame Impala
|colspan=2| Innerspeaker
|
|-
|colspan=2|Washington
|colspan=2| I Believe You Liar
|
|-
!colspan=5|
Single of the Year
|-
!colspan=2|Artist
!colspan=2|Single
!Result
|-
|colspan=2|Angus & Julia Stone
|colspan=2|"Big Jet Plane"
|
|-
|colspan=2|Birds of Tokyo
|colspan=2|"Plans"
|
|-
|colspan=2|Sia
|colspan=2|"Clap Your Hands"
|
|-
|colspan=2|The Temper Trap
|colspan=2|"Love Lost"
|
|-
|colspan=2|Washington
|colspan=2|"How to Tame Lions"
|
|-
!colspan=5|
Best Female Artist
|-
!colspan=2|Artist
!colspan=2|Album
!Result
|-
|colspan=2|Clare Bowditch
|colspan=2|Modern Day Addiction
|
|-
|colspan=2|Kylie Minogue
|colspan=2| Aphrodite
|
|-
|colspan=2|Lisa Mitchell
|colspan=2|"Oh! Hark!"
|
|-
|colspan=2|Sia
|colspan=2|We Are Born
|
|-
|colspan=2|Washington
|colspan=2| I Believe You Liar
|
|-
!colspan=5|
Best Male Artist
|-
!colspan=2|Artist
!colspan=2|Album
!Result
|-
|colspan=2|Dan Kelly
|colspan=2|Dan Kelly's Dream
|
|-
|colspan=2|Dan Sultan
|colspan=2|Get Out While You Can
|
|-
|colspan=2|Guy Sebastian
|colspan=2| Like It Like That
|
|-
|colspan=2|John Butler
|colspan=2| April Uprising
|
|-
|colspan=2|Paul Dempsey
| colspan="2" | "Fast Friends"
|
|-
!colspan=5|
Best Group
|-
!colspan=2|Artist
!colspan=2|Album
!Result
|-
|colspan=2|Angus & Julia Stone
|colspan=2| Down the Way
|
|-
|colspan=2|Birds of Tokyo
|colspan=2| Birds of Tokyo
|
|-
|colspan=2|Powderfinger
|colspan=2| Golden Rule
|
|-
|colspan=2|Tame Impala
|colspan=2| Innerspeaker
|
|-
|colspan=2|The Temper Trap
|colspan=2| Conditions
|
|-
!colspan=5|
Best Independent Release
|-
!colspan=2|Artist
!colspan=2|Album
!Result
|-
|colspan=2|Art vs. Science
|colspan=2| Magic Fountain
|
|-
|colspan=2|Dan Sultan
|colspan=2| Get Out While You Can
|
|-
|colspan=2|Eddy Current Suppression Ring
|colspan=2| Rush to Relax
|
|-
|colspan=2|John Butler Trio
|colspan=2| April Uprising
|
|-
|colspan=2|Sia
|colspan=2| We Are Born
|
|-
!colspan=6|
Best Adult Alternative Album
|-
!colspan=2|Artist
!colspan=2|Album
!Result
|-
|colspan=2|Angus & Julia Stone
|colspan=2| Down the Way
|
|-
|colspan=2|Basement Birds
|colspan=2| Basement Birds
|
|-
|colspan=2|Clare Bowditch
|colspan=2| Modern Day Addiction
|
|-
|colspan=2|The Cat Empire
|colspan=2| Cinema
|
|-
|colspan=2|Washington
|colspan=2| I Believe You Liar
|
|-
|colspan=2|Whitley
|colspan=2| Go Forth, Find Mammoth
|
|-
!colspan=5|
Best Adult Contemporary Album
|-
!colspan=2|Artist
!colspan=2|Album
!Result
|-
|colspan=2|Angie Hart
|colspan=2| Eat My Shadow
|
|-
|colspan=2|Crowded House
|colspan=2| Intriguer
|
|-
|colspan=2|Jimmy Barnes
|colspan=2| The Rhythm and the Blues
|
|-
|colspan=2|Lisa Miller
|colspan=2| Car Tape 2
|
|-
|colspan=2|Perry Keyes
|colspan=2| Johnny Ray's Downtown
|
|-
!colspan=5|
Best Blues & Roots Album
|-
!colspan=2|Artist
!colspan=2|Album
!Result
|-
|colspan=2|Ash Grunwald
|colspan=2| Hot Mama Vibes
|
|-
|colspan=2|Dan Sultan
|colspan=2| Get Out While You Can
|
|-
|colspan=2|Jeff Lang
|colspan=2| Chimeradour
|
|-
|colspan=2|John Butler Trio
|colspan=2| April Uprising
|
|-
|colspan=2|The Wilson Pickers
|colspan=2| Shake It Down
|
|-
!colspan=5|
Best Children's Album
|-
!colspan=2|Artist
!colspan=2|Album
!Result
|-
|colspan=2|Greta Bradman
|colspan=2| Forest of Dreams: Classical Lullabies to Get Lost In
|
|-
|colspan=2|Jay Laga'aia
|colspan=2| I Can Play Anything
|
|-
|colspan=2|Justine Clarke
|colspan=2| Great Big World
|
|-
|colspan=2|Little Kasey Chambers, Poppa Bill and the Little Hillbillies
|colspan=2| Little Kasey Chambers, Poppa Bill and the Little Hillbillies
|
|-
|colspan=2|The Wiggles
|colspan=2| Let's Eat!
|
|-
!colspan=5|
Best Comedy Release
|-
!colspan=2|Artist
!colspan=2|Album
!Result
|-
|colspan=2|Andrew Hansen, Chris Taylor & Craig Shuftan
|colspan=2| The Blow Parade|
|-
|colspan=2|Arj Barker
|colspan=2| Arj Barker Forever|
|-
|colspan=2| Heath Franklin
|colspan=2| Heath Franklin's Chopper: Make Deadsh*ts History|
|-
|colspan=2|Jimeoin
|colspan=2| Jimeoin on Ice Live|
|-
|colspan=2|The Bedroom Philosopher
|colspan=2| Songs from the 86 Tram|
|-
!colspan=5|
Best Country Album
|-
!colspan=2|Artist
!colspan=2|Album
!Result
|-
|colspan=2|Adam Harvey
|colspan=2| Both Sides Now|
|-
|colspan=2|Catherine Britt
|colspan=2| Catherine Britt|
|-
|colspan=2|Jason Walker
|colspan=2| Ceiling Sun Letters|
|-
|colspan=2|Lee Kernaghan
|colspan=2| Planet Country|
|-
|colspan=2|The McClymonts
|colspan=2| Wrapped Up Good|
|-
!colspan=5|
Best Dance Release
|-
!colspan=2|Artist
!colspan=2|Single
!Result
|-
|colspan=2|Art vs Science
|colspan=2|"Magic Fountain"
|
|-
|colspan=2|Miami Horror
|colspan=2| "Sometimes"
|
|-
|colspan=2|Midnight Juggernauts
|colspan=2| "The Crystal Axis"
|
|-
|colspan=2|Pendulum
|colspan=2| "Immersion"
|
|-
|colspan=2|Yolanda Be Cool & DCUP
|colspan=2|"We No Speak Americano"
|
|-
!colspan=5|
Best Hard Rock/Heavy Metal Album
|-
!colspan=2|Artist
!colspan=2|Album
!Result
|-
|colspan=2|Airbourne
|colspan=2| No Guts. No Glory.|
|-
|colspan=2|Dead Letter Circus
|colspan=2| This Is the Warning|
|-
|colspan=2|Parkway Drive
|colspan=2| Deep Blue|
|-
|colspan=2|The Amity Affliction
|colspan=2| Youngbloods|
|-
|colspan=2|Violent Soho
|colspan=2| Violent Soho|
|-
!colspan=5|
Best Music DVD
|-
!colspan=2|Artist
!colspan=2|DVD
!Result
|-
|colspan=2|Birds of Tokyo
|colspan=2| The Broken Strings Tour DVD|
|-
|colspan=2|Bliss n Eso
|colspan=2| Flying Colours Live|
|-
|colspan=2|Josh Pyke
|colspan=2| The Lighthouse|
|-
|colspan=2|Various Artists
|colspan=2| Sound Relief|
|-
|colspan=2|Various Artists
|colspan=2| Before Too Long: Triple J's Tribute to Paul Kelly|
|-
!colspan=5|
Best Pop Release
|-
!colspan=2|Artist
!colspan=2|Release
!Result
|-
|colspan=2|Bluejuice
|colspan=2| Head of the Hawk|
|-
|colspan=2|Empire of the Sun
|colspan=2| "Half Mast"
|
|-
|colspan=2|Guy Sebastian
|colspan=2| Like It Like That|
|-
|colspan=2|Kylie Minogue
|colspan=2| Aphrodite|
|-
|colspan=2|Sia
|colspan=2| We Are Born|
|-
!colspan=5|
Best Rock Album
|-
!colspan=2|Artist
!colspan=2|Album
!Result
|-
|colspan=2|Birds of Tokyo
|colspan=2| Birds of Tokyo|
|-
|colspan=2|Cloud Control
|colspan=2| Bliss Release|
|-
|colspan=2|Eddy Current Suppression Ring
|colspan=2| Rush to Relax|
|-
|colspan=2|Powderfinger
|colspan=2| Golden Rule|
|-
|colspan=2|Tame Impala
|colspan=2| Innerspeaker|
|-
!colspan=5|
Best Urban Album
|-
!colspan=2|Artist
!colspan=2|Album
!Result
|-
|colspan=2|Bliss n Eso
|colspan=2| Running on Air|
|-
|colspan=2|Lowrider
|colspan=2| Round the World|
|-
|colspan=2|M-Phazes
|colspan=2| Good Gracious|
|-
|colspan=2|Space Invadas
|colspan=2| Soul-Fi|
|-
|colspan=2|Urthboy
|colspan=2| Spitshine|
|-
!colspan=5|
Breakthrough Artist
|-
!colspan=2|Artist
!colspan=2|Album
!Result
|-
|colspan=2|Amy Meredith
|colspan=2| Restless|
|-
|colspan=2|Cloud Control
|colspan=2| Bliss Release|
|-
|colspan=2|Philadelphia Grand Jury
|colspan=2| Hope Is for Hopers|
|-
|colspan=2|Tame Impala
|colspan=2| Innerspeaker|
|-
|colspan=2|Washington
|colspan=2| I Believe You Liar|
|}

Fine Arts Awards
"Best Jazz Album" category was moved to Fine Arts Awards from ARIA Awards section. Final nominees are shown, with result at right.

 Artisan Awards 
The winners and nominees of the Artisan Awards were announced on 28 September 2010.Final nominees and winners, results shown at right. Public voted awards 
For the first time in ARIA Awards history, the public voted in four new categories. Initial nominees for both "Most Popular Australian Album" and "Most Popular Australian Single" were the ten highest selling albums and singles, respectively, in the eligibility period (28 August 2009 to 21 August 2010 inclusive). The third category is "Most Popular International Artist" where non-Australian artists with highest selling albums or singles are nominated. "Most Popular Australian Artist" nominees are pooled from the finalists in 26 categories of the year's ARIA Awards (excludes ARIA Artisan Awards nominees). First round of voting occurred from 14 to 28 October to determine the final five nominees. The second round of voting occurred from 31 October to 6 November with the winners announced on 7 November.Final nominees are shown, with result at right''.

See also 
Music of Australia

References

External links 

2010 in Australian music
2010 music awards
ARIA Music Awards
Television series by Fremantle (company)